Smalley may refer to:

People
Smalley (surname)

Places
Smalley's Inn & Restaurant in Carmel, New York, USA
Smalley, Derbyshire, a village in England

Other
A type of small excavator: see Smalley (excavator)
USS Smalley (DD-565),a Fletcher-class US navy destroyer

See also
 Small (disambiguation)
 Smalleye squaretail a species of fish